No. 12 Squadron was a squadron of the Sri Lanka Air Force. It operated in both ground attack and close air support role operating with Mikoyan MiG-27s  from SLAF Katunayake. The Squadron also operated a single Mikoyan MiG-23UB as conversion trainer for the MiG-27. In early 2019 SLAF shut down No. 12 Squadron.

History
The squadron was formed in November 2007, when the MiG-27s which had been attached to the No. 5 Squadron were formed into its own squadron.

Aircraft operated

Year of introduction
 Mikoyan MiG-27 - 2007
 Mikoyan MiG-23UB - 2007

References

External links
Ruling the sky 
Men who killed Thamilselvam speak

Military units and formations established in 2007
12